Sokolniki Arena or Sokolniki Sports Palace is a former indoor sporting arena located in Moscow, Russia. It is located in the Sokolniki District of the city. Initially it was an outdoor skating rink, roofed in 1973 during the preparations for the 1973 Summer Universiade. The capacity of the arena is 5,000.

The Sokolniki Sports Palace was a venue of handball tournament for the 1980 Summer Olympics. It is the home arena of the HK Lokomotiv Moscow ice hockey team.

The Sokolniki Arena was demolished in December 2021.

Tragedy 

On March 10, 1975, at a friendly match between Soviet and Canadian youth hockey teams at the Sokolniki Arena, at least 20 people were killed in a stampede after the lights went out.

Notes

References
1980 Summer Olympics official report. Volume 2. Part 1. pp. 114–7.

External links
Official website of the Sokolniki Sports Palace

Kontinental Hockey League venues
Indoor arenas built in the Soviet Union
Indoor ice hockey venues in Russia
Indoor arenas in Russia
Handball venues in Russia
HC Spartak Moscow
Venues of the 1980 Summer Olympics
Olympic handball venues